Lasermannen ("The Laserman") is a Swedish mini series based on real events produced by SVT Drama, based on the bestselling book Lasermannen – en berättelse om Sverige by Gellert Tamas, which is based on the Lasermannen events. It is known as one of the Swedish movie-industry's most well-made and well-acted films. Not to be confused with the Swedish documentary also called "Lasermannen" or "Lasermannen (en dokumentär)".

Story 
The three-part mini series follows the police investigation of a series of brutal shootings against immigrants in Stockholm during the early 1990s, and the story is intwined with the life and tragic history of the lone-wolf racist serial shooter John Ausonius, played by the look-alike actor David Dencik.

Cast
David Dencik – John Ausonius
Sten Ljunggren – Lennart Thorin
Sten Johan Hedman – Thorstensson
Amanda Ooms – Ilse
Kenneth Milldoff – Lars-Erik Forss
Ralph Carlsson – Stefan Bergqvist
Leif Andrée – Tommy Lindström
Pale Olofsson – Eklind
Per Morberg – Prisoner

References

External links

2005 Swedish television series debuts